Rudolf Dannhauer (born 29 June 1934) is a German cross-country skier. He competed at the 1960 Winter Olympics and the 1964 Winter Olympics.

References

External links
 

1934 births
Living people
German male cross-country skiers
Olympic cross-country skiers of the United Team of Germany
Cross-country skiers at the 1960 Winter Olympics
Cross-country skiers at the 1964 Winter Olympics
People from Wernigerode
Sportspeople from Saxony-Anhalt